Goriča Vas is a village in the Municipality of Ribnica in southern Slovenia. It lies just south of the town of Ribnica. The area is part of the traditional region of Lower Carniola and is now included in the Southeast Slovenia Statistical Region.

The local church, built outside the village to the south, is dedicated to the Holy Name of Mary and belongs to the Parish of Ribnica. It is a medieval building with 16th- and 19th-century additions.

References

External links
Goriča Vas on Geopedia

Populated places in the Municipality of Ribnica